This is a complete list of episodes of the Fox/The WB sitcom Grounded for Life.

Series overview

Episodes

Season 1 (2001)

Season 2 (2001–02)

Season 3 (2002–03)

Season 4 (2003–04)

Season 5 (2004–05)

Notes

References

Sources
 List of episodes at TVGuide.com
 List of episodes at TV MSN
 
 

Lists of American sitcom episodes